Daniel Přerovský (born 5 March 1992) is a professional Czech football player currently playing for MFK Vyškov. He made 30 league appearances and scored one goal for FC Zbrojovka Brno over the course of three seasons. After not making a single appearance for the team in the 2014–15 Czech First League season, he moved to SK Líšeň in the Moravian–Silesian Football League, the third tier of Czech football. He then joined Vyškov in the third level of Czech football in the autumn of 2015.

References

External links
 
 
 Profile at FC Zbrojovka Brno official site

1992 births
Czech First League players
Czech National Football League players
Czech footballers
FC Zbrojovka Brno players
FK Blansko players
Living people
Association football midfielders
People from Vyškov
Sportspeople from the South Moravian Region